Dai Changren (born 1999) is a Chinese chess player.

Chess career
He played in the Chess World Cup 2017, being defeated by former world champion Vladimir Kramnik in the first round.

References

External links 

Dai Changren chess games at 365Chess.com

1999 births
Living people
Chinese chess players